Sören Åkeby (born 23 February 1952) is a Swedish football manager and former player.

Career
Along with Zoran Lukić, Åkeby managed Djurgårdens IF from 1999 to 2003. The two were very successful during the first years of the 21st century winning the Allsvenskan in 2002 and 2003. During the 2008 season he managed the Norwegian team of Aalesunds FK, but was fired in September 2008. On 2 October the same year GIF Sundsvall announced that Sören Åkeby would be the new manager of the club.

Honours
Djurgårdens IF
 Superettan: 2000
 Allsvenskan: 2002, 2003
 Svenska Cupen: 2002

Individual
 Swedish Manager of the Year: 2002, 2003

References

1952 births
Living people
Footballers from Stockholm
Swedish footballers
Hammarby Fotboll players
Swedish football managers
Gröndals IK managers
Östersunds FK managers
Djurgårdens IF Fotboll managers
Aarhus Gymnastikforening managers
Malmö FF managers
Aalesunds FK managers
GIF Sundsvall managers
Swedish expatriate football managers
Expatriate football managers in Denmark
Expatriate football managers in Norway
Swedish expatriate sportspeople in Denmark
Swedish expatriate sportspeople in Norway
AIK Fotboll non-playing staff

Association footballers not categorized by position
Älvsjö AIK managers